Lessons in Good Love (Spanish:Lecciones de buen amor) is a 1944 Spanish film directed by Rafael Gil.

Cast
   Juan Domenech 
 Félix Fernández 
 Milagros Leal 
 Luis Martínez  
 Manolo Morán  
 José Orjas 
 Nicolás D. Perchicot 
 Pastora Peña 
 Rafael Rivelles 
 Mercedes Vecino

References

Bibliography
 de España, Rafael. Directory of Spanish and Portuguese film-makers and films. Greenwood Press, 1994.

External links 

1944 films
1940s Spanish-language films
Films directed by Rafael Gil
Films scored by Juan Quintero Muñoz
Spanish black-and-white films
1940s Spanish films